The Army Public School, Dhaula Kuan  is a public school located at Delhi, India. It is operated under Indian Army supervision under the aegis of Indian Army welfare Education society (AWES). It is part of the chain of Indian Army Public Schools.

History
In May 1953, the residents of the Maulana Azad Road Officers' Hostel started the institution following the public school pattern, with 21 children and two teachers and named as the Defense Services Public School. The school was extended to eighth standard in July 1959, when it received recognition by the Directorate of Education, Delhi. Soon upgraded to the XI standard, it was affiliated to the University of Cambridge Local Examination Syndicate. The school was renamed as 'Army Public School' in 1976. Later, the school received affiliation to the Central Board of Secondary Education (CBSE). It shifted to its present location on the Ridge Road in July 1970, occupying 31 acres of land.

Houses
The students in the school are divided into four houses:

References

External links 
 

Schools in Delhi
Indian Army Public Schools
1953 establishments in India
Educational institutions established in 1953